John Warren (born September 23, 1938 in Montreal, Quebec) is a Canadian jazz musician (saxophone) and composer, known for the cooperation with John Surman and Mike Westbrook.

Career
Warren has played with many of the UK's most notable modernists like John Surman and Mike Westbrook, beginning in the '60s. He was a regular member of Mike Westbrook Concert Band and The Mike Westbrook Orchestra.

Discography
Tales of the Algonquin (Deram, 1971), with John Surman
The Brass Project (ECM Records, 1993), with John Surman
Finally Beginning (Fuzzy Moon Records, 2008)
Following On (Fuzzy Moon Records, 2009)
The Traveller's Tale (Fledg'ling Records, 2017)

References

1938 births
Anglophone Quebec people
Canadian jazz composers
Male jazz composers
Canadian jazz musicians
Canadian jazz saxophonists
Male saxophonists
Living people
Musicians from Montreal
21st-century saxophonists
21st-century Canadian male musicians